Manuel Schüttengruber (born 20 July 1983) is an Austrian football referee who officiates in the  Austrian Football Bundesliga. He has been a FIFA referee since 2014, and is ranked as a UEFA first category referee.

Refereeing career
In 2010, Schüttengruber began officiating in the Austrian Football Bundesliga. His first match as referee was on 28 August 2010 between SV Mattersburg and Red Bull Salzburg. He also officiated two matches in the Swiss Super League in 2012. In 2014, he was put on the FIFA referees list. He officiated his first senior international match as a FIFA referee on 15 November 2016 between the Czech Republic and Denmark.

References

External links
 Profile at WorldFootball.net
 Profile at EU-Football.info

1983 births
Living people
Sportspeople from Linz
Austrian football referees